"One Day in Your Life" is a song by American singer Anastacia from her second studio album Freak of Nature (2001). Co-written with and produced by Sam Watters and Louis Biancaniello, the song was released as the album's second single on February 25, 2002, by Daylight Records and Epic Records. It was the first single from Freak of Nature to be released in the United States, peaking at number one on the Billboard Dance Club Songs chart.

Composition
"One Day in Your Life" was written by Anastacia and co-written with and produced by Sam Watters and Louis Biancaniello. A "soulful" disco song, it features a funk synthesizer.

Critical reception
Jose F. Promis from AllMusic called it "dramatic" and said that "it follows the same formula as her previous hit, 'I'm Outta Love,' but better, with more soaring, epic vocals, and sounds like a rock version of a forgotten disco classic." Mark Bautz from Entertainment Weekly commented that "it has a kicky Flashdance retro vibe." Aidin Vaziri from Rolling Stone called it "a moment of sheer overkill."

Chart performance
Though "One Day in Your Life" never charted on the U.S. Billboard Hot 100, it earned Anastacia her first chart-topper on Billboards Hot Dance Club Play chart, staying atop for one week. The single fared far better elsewhere, charting within the top ten in Australia and several European countries, including Austria, Germany, Hungary, Italy, the Netherlands, and Switzerland, while peaking at number eleven on the UK Singles Chart.

Live performances
Anastacia performed "One Day in Your Life" at several live events such as the Edison Awards on February 27, 2002 (where she won the award for Best International Female), VH1's Divas Las Vegas on May 23, 2002, the Royal Variety Performance on December 2, 2002, and the Life Ball on May 20, 2006, as well as on television shows like Live with Regis and Kelly in the United States, Top of the Pops in the United Kingdom, Wetten, dass..? in Germany, and Rove Live in Australia. In addition, she performed the song on her 2004–05 Live at Last Tour (although it was not included on the Live at Last DVD) and on her 2009 Heavy Rotation Tour.

Music videos
Being her first music video directed by Dave Meyers, who has also directed videos for Janet Jackson, Britney Spears, Pink, and Bow Wow, the video was shot on January 16–17, 2002 in Los Angeles and Santa Monica, California. In the beginning, while the sun is rising up, Anastacia is shown eating a bowl of cereal for breakfast, while singing the first verse of the song. After the slow opening, she dances through the room and you see other people in a sort of a game house. The video shows men playing volleyball on the beach and other people swimming in the pool. Then Anastacia is seen lying on a pool side with braids wearing a bikini. When the second chorus breaks, an old man sprinkles her wet using his hose. Next, the camera travels through a sand castle. When it gets out of the castle, Anastacia is seen dancing while behind her people are skateboarding on a ramp. An alternate version of the video also exists, which was released in the United States. This version of the video mainly contains footage from the regular video featuring some new scenes, from the same video shoot. Both versions are available on her The Video Collection DVD.

Track listings

US DVD single
 "One Day in Your Life" (video clip)
 "One Day in Your Life" (video clip—US version)
 "One Day in Your Life" (making of the video)

UK CD single
 "One Day in Your Life" (album version) – 3:26
 "One Day in Your Life" (M*A*S*H classic mix) – 7:41
 "One Day in Your Life" (Almighty mix) – 7:44
 "One Day in Your Life" (video)

UK cassette single
 "One Day in Your Life" (album version) – 3:26
 "One Day in Your Life" (M*A*S*H radio mix 2) – 3:56
 "One Day in Your Life" (Almighty mix) – 7:44

European CD single
 "One Day in Your Life" (album version) – 3:26
 "One Day in Your Life" (M*A*S*H classic mix) – 8:48

Australian CD single
 "One Day in Your Life" (album version)
 "One Day in Your Life" (M*A*S*H radio mix)
 "One Day in Your Life" (Almighty mix)
 "One Day in Your Life" (M*A*S*H classic mix)
 "One Day in Your Life" (video)

Japanese CD single
 "One Day in Your Life" (album version) – 3:27
 "Bad Girls" (live at the Brits 2002 with Jamiroquai) – 4:13
 "One Day in Your Life" (M*A*S*H radio mix) – 3:38
 "One Day in Your Life" (Almighty dub) – 6:00

Credits and personnel
Credits are adapted from the UK CD single liner notes.

Studios
 Recorded at Homesite 13 (Novato, California) and Right Track Recording (New York City)
 Mixed at Homesite 13 (Novato, California)

Personnel
 Anastacia – writing, vocals, background vocals
 Sam Watters – writing, background vocals, production, arrangement, engineering
 Louis Biancaniello – writing, keyboards, production, arrangement, mixing, programming, engineering
 Dameon Aranda – guitar
 Pete Karam – engineering
 Nick Howard – engineering assistant
 Andrew Selluss – engineering assistant

Charts

Weekly charts

Year-end charts

Certifications

Release history

References

2001 songs
2002 singles
Anastacia songs
Daylight Records singles
Disco songs
Epic Records singles
Music videos directed by Dave Meyers (director)
Songs written by Anastacia
Songs written by Louis Biancaniello
Songs written by Sam Watters